Cartelles is an extinct genus of New World monkey. Fossils of this species were found in Bahia, Brazil within the Toca da Boa Vista caves, and were originally described as belonging to another extinct Atelidae genus, Protopithecus.

Description
 Unlike most living New World Monkeys, Cartelles probably spent a good deal of its time on the ground, though it was also as proficient in arboreal locomotion as its smaller living relatives. It lived as recently as 15,000 BP.

Fossils of Cartelles were found in 1992 and were originally assigned to the genus Protopithecus. However, subsequent re-examination of its skeleton have showed many distinct cranial and postcranial features. Elements of the skull indicate that its closest living relatives are howler monkeys, and it is considered a member of the subfamily Alouattinae. It is uncertain if Cartelles could have howled like living howler monkeys, however.

The genus was named in honor of palaeontologist Cástor Cartelle, who described the original fossil material.

References

Prehistoric primate genera
Pleistocene primates
Pleistocene mammals of South America
Pleistocene Brazil
Fossils of Brazil
New World monkeys
Prehistoric monotypic mammal genera